Dorothy Dickson (July 25, 1893 – September 25, 1995) was an American-born, London-based theater actress and singer, and a centenarian.

Biography and Career
Dickson is known mostly for her rendition of the Jerome Kern song "Look for the Silver Lining". She was also a member of the Ziegfeld Follies and made many appearances in New York and abroad. In 1922, she starred in The Cabaret Girl. In 1936, she co-starred with Ivor Novello in his Careless Rapture and, in 1937, in his Crest of the Wave.

Dickson starred in a few silent films, including Eastward Ho! (1919) and Paying the Piper (1921).

During her early days on the London stage, Dickson was introduced to another future celebrity (as well as centenarian), Elizabeth Bowes-Lyon, later the Queen Mother. The two became close friends and their friendship lasted until Dickson's death at age 102.  Her daughter was the actress Dorothy Hyson, who was married to Sir Anthony Quayle.

During the Second World War she was involved in organising the London version of Stage Door Canteen.   

In 2006, Angus McBean's photograph of Dorothy Dickson was used on the poster for an exhibition of his photographs at the National Portrait Gallery, London, as well as on the cover of the accompanying book.

Stage
 The Private Road by John Carlton (1934), Comedy Theatre
 Stop Press (1935), Adelphi Theatre
 Careless Rapture by Ivor Novello (1938),Theatre Royal Dury Lane
 Crest of the Wave by Ivor Novello (1937), Theatre Royal Dury Lane
 Fine and Dandy (1942),Saville Theatre
 Our Betters by William Somereset Maugham, (1946)
 As Long As They’re Happy with Jack Buchanan (1953), Garrick Theatre

Filmography
 Eastward Ho! (1919)
 The Silver Lining (1921)
 Paying the Piper (1921)
 Headin' North (1921)
 The Road Is Fine (1930)
 Channel Crossing (1933)
 Danny Boy (1934)
 Sword of Honour (1939)

References

External links

 
 
  Dorothy Dickson performances in Theatre Archive, University of Bristol

1893 births
1995 deaths
American centenarians
American stage actresses
American expatriate actresses in the United Kingdom
20th-century American actresses
Women centenarians